Jackie Gallagher-Smith (born December 11, 1967) is an American professional golfer who played on the LPGA Tour.
 
Gallagher-Smith has won once on the LPGA Tour in 1999.

Gallagher-Smith's brother, Jim Gallagher Jr., has won on the PGA Tour, making them one of two brother/sister pairs (the other is Billy Kratzert and Cathy Gerring) to win on both tours. Her brother, Jeff Gallagher, has won twice on the Nationwide Tour.

Personal life
In 2005, a former caddie, Gary Robinson filed a suit claiming that the golfer had used him as an "unwitting sperm donor" to get pregnant. Robinson started caddying for Gallagher-Smith in early 2004 and later they entered into a sexual relationship. Robinson claimed that she told him she and her husband had been unsuccessful in conceiving a child. In July, Robinson claimed that she told him she was pregnant, leading him to believe he was the father. He eventually dropped the lawsuit.

Professional wins

LPGA Tour wins (1)

References

External links

American female golfers
LSU Lady Tigers golfers
LPGA Tour golfers
Golfers from Indiana
People from Marion, Indiana
1967 births
Living people